The Edinburgh Advertiser, sometimes referred to as The Advertiser, was a twice-weekly newspaper published in Edinburgh, Scotland, on Tuesday and Friday mornings for almost a century, from 1764 to 1859.

At the time of its inception, it was the only newspaper published on these days of the week in Edinburgh. It ran from 3 January 1764 until 29 March 1859 when it merged with the Edinburgh Evening Courant.  Through the years, its offices were located at Castlehill; No. 91 Rose Street; No. 13 South Hanover Street; 210 High Street; 15 India Street; and 7 Heriot Row.

Publishers
Its first publishers were Alexander Donaldson and John Reid. Reid's name appeared on the masthead briefly, only through 21 August 1764, at which time, only Donaldson's continued. Donaldson, a bookseller as well as printer and publisher, is most notable for the 1774 Donaldson v Beckett court case relating to shared perpetual copyrights. In 1774, the newspaper passed from Donaldson to his son, James Donaldson. In 1820, James sold the paper to Claud Muirhead of Heriot Row and Gogar Park, Midlothian. Of the large fortune made by the Donaldsons, James bequeathed it for the endowment of Donaldson's Hospital.

Operations
Claud's father, James Muirhead, printer, Burgess and Guild Brother, served as the newspaper's printer, principal manager and superintendent. Rev. Andrew Crichton, a Scottish biographer and historian, served as editor until 1851 when he was replaced by Robert W. Paterson. For a short period, editorial control was held by Robert Chambers. At one point in time, Christopher North (the pseudonym of the Scottish writer John Wilson), was said to be associated with the Edinburgh Advertiser. James Macaulay was a foreman. Journeymen printers included John Bryce, James Lamb, Robert Lamb, and George Robertson.  Two of the pressmen were James Thomson and Joseph Thompson.

The paper was run frugally. Its initial cost was 2½d, and it was increased to 7d by 1820. It covered news, religion, trade, manufacturing, agriculture, politics, and entertainment of Great Britain and the Colonial United States; it also published essays. Its motto, Quidquid agunt homines, uotum, timor, ira, uoluptas, gaudia, discursus, nostri farrago libelli, (translation: "whatever men do – prayer, fear, rage, pleasure, joy, running about – is the grist of my little book") is a satire by the Roman poet Juvenal.

History
The newspaper was the first to publish some historically important pieces. The first publication of Epitaph: On Robert Fergusson appeared in the 7–11 August 1789 issue. One literary note was the first publication of Robert Burns' On the Commemoration of Rodney's Victory which appeared in the 16–19 April 1793 issue. After Burns' death, several of his epigrams were published in the 8 August 1800 issue.

See also
List of newspapers in Scotland

References

1764 establishments in Scotland
1859 disestablishments in Scotland
18th century in Scotland
Publications established in 1764
Publications disestablished in 1859
Defunct newspapers published in the United Kingdom
Defunct weekly newspapers
Newspapers published in Scotland
History of Edinburgh
Mass media in Edinburgh
18th century in Edinburgh
19th century in Edinburgh